Aram Avagyan (born 18 January 1991 in Yerevan) is an Armenian professional boxer who held the WBC International Silver featherweight title from 2018 to 2019. As an amateur, he won bronze medals at the European championships in 2013 and 2015 as a bantamweight. He was eliminated in the second bout at the 2016 Olympics. Avagyan studies criminology at the Russian Armenian University in Yerevan.

Professional boxing record

References

External links

 
  (archive)
  
 

Living people
1991 births
Armenian male boxers
Featherweight boxers
Bantamweight boxers
Olympic boxers of Armenia
Boxers at the 2016 Summer Olympics
European Games competitors for Armenia
Boxers at the 2015 European Games
Sportspeople from Yerevan